Pallu or Pällu may refer to:

People 
 Pallu (biblical figure), a son of Reuben
 Pallu Reddanna, Indian scientist
 François Pallu (1626–1684), French bishop
 Georges Pallu (1869–1948), French screenwriter and film director

Places 
 Pällu, Harju County, a village in Saue Parish, Harju County, Estonia
 Pällu, Jõgeva County, a village in Saare Parish, Jõgeva County, Estonia
 La Pallu, a commune in Mayenne, France
 Pallu, Rajasthan, a village in Hanumangarh district, Rajasthan, India

Other 
 Pallu (poetry), a genre of Tamil poetry
 Pallu, the loose end of a sari